Pembina Municipal Airport  is a public use airport located one nautical mile (2 km) south of the central business district of Pembina, a city in Pembina County, North Dakota, United States. It is owned by the Pembina Airport Authority. This airport is included in the National Plan of Integrated Airport Systems for 2011–2015, which categorized it as a general aviation facility.

Facilities and aircraft 
Pembina Municipal Airport covers an area of 225 acres (91 ha) at an elevation of 795 feet (242 m) above mean sea level. It has one runway designated 15/33 with an asphalt surface measuring 3,800 by 75 feet (1,158 x 23 m).

For the 12-month period ending May 31, 2009, the airport had 1,500 aircraft operations, an average of 125 per month: 80% general aviation, 13% air taxi, and 7% military.
At that time there were 7 aircraft based at this airport: 86% single-engine and 14% glider.

References

External links 
 Pembina Municipal (PMB) at North Dakota Aeronautics Commission airport directory
 Aerial image as of September 1997 from USGS The National Map
 
 

Airports in North Dakota
Buildings and structures in Pembina County, North Dakota
Transportation in Pembina County, North Dakota